Penstemon albomarginatus is an uncommon species of penstemon known by the common name white-margined beardtongue. It is native to the deserts of southern Nevada and western Arizona, as well as in two desert washes in the Mojave Desert in California. It is a perennial herb with several erect stems emerging from a taproot in the sand, their base buried beneath the surface. The stem branches are hairless and somewhat waxy in texture, reaching up to about 35 centimeters tall. The oppositely arranged leaves are oblong or widely lance-shaped, pale green edged in white, and up to 5 centimeters long. The inflorescence produces several purplish-pink tubular flowers between 1 and 2 centimeters long surrounded at the bases by toothed, white-edged sepals. The flower has some hairs in the mouth, but the staminode is hairless. The flowers are pollinated by vespid wasps and probably other insects, such as carabid beetles.

References

External links

albomarginatus
Flora of Arizona
Flora of California
Flora of Nevada